Jonathan Judge is an American film, and television director and producer.

He has directed episodes for a number of children's television series namely Blue's Clues, LazyTown, Ned's Declassified School Survival Guide, Big Time Rush, The Naked Brothers Band, Imagination Movers, The Fresh Beat Band, The Let's Go Show, The Sprout Sharing Show, and Zeke and Luther. His few credits outside the children's television field include directing the pilot episode of the Comedy Central series Tosh.0 and the Current TV series Bar Karma. Prior to working in television, he directed two short films Bitch in the Kitchen (1998) and Real Jokes (1999).

As a television producer, he has worked on Nickelodeon's U-Pick Live and the pre-shows for the 2009 and 2010 Nickelodeon Kids' Choice Awards.

Filmography

Director
Blue's Clues - 2003-2004 - 2 episodes
Blue's Room - 2004 - 1 episode
Ned's Declassified School Survival Guide - 2006 - 1 episode
LazyTown - 2005-2007 - 12 episodes
Out of Jimmy's Head - 2007 - 1 episode
Johnny and the Sprites - 2008 - 3 episodes
Imagination Movers - 2008 - 4 episodes
The Naked Brothers Band - 2008-2009 - 11 episodes
Tosh.0 - 2009 - 1 episode
The Fresh Beat Band - 2009-2011 - 13 episodes
Big Time Rush - 2010-2013 - 16 episodes
Zeke and Luther - 2011 - 2 episodes
Bar Karma - 2012 - 5 episodes
Supah Ninjas - 2011-2012 - 4 episodes
Level Up - 2012 - 1 episode
Fred 3: Camp Fred - 2012 - TV Movie
See Dad Run - 2012-2014 - 6 episodes
Fred: The Show - 2012 - 11 episodes
Marvin Marvin - 2013 - 1 episode
Instant Mom - 2013-2015 - 9 episodes
Swindle - 2013 - TV Movie
The Thundermans - 2013-2018 - 23 episodes
The Haunted Hathaways - 2014 - 2 episodes
Nicky, Ricky, Dicky & Dawn - 2014-2015 - 5 episodes
100 Things to Do Before High School - 2014-2016 - 7 episodes
Bella and the Bulldogs - 2015-2016 - 4 episodes
Dog with a Blog - 2015 - 2 episodes
Sigmund and the Sea Monsters - 2016 - 1 episode
Gortimer Gibbon's Life on Normal Street - 2016 - 1 episode
School of Rock - 2016-2018 - 10 episodes
Life in Pieces - 2017-2019 - 5 episodes
Young Sheldon - 2018 - 1 episode
Knight Squad - 2018-2019 - 3 episodes
The Cool Kids - 2018-2019 - 3 episodes
Cousins for Life - 2018-2019 - 5 episodes
Prince of Peoria - 2018-2019 - 2 episodes
All That - 2019 - 8 episodes
The Expanding Universe of Ashley Garcia - 2020 - 1 episode
Outmatched - 2020 - 2 episodes
Mr. Iglesias - 2020 - 3 episodes
Punky Brewster - 2021 - 3 episodes
Warped! - 2022 - 4 episodesPuppy Place - 2022 - 4 episodesThe Really Loud House - 2022-present - 7 episodes
ProducerSigmund and the Sea Monsters - 2016-2017 - co-executive producerPunky Brewster - 2021 - executive producerWarped! - 2022 - executive producerThe Really Loud House'' - 2022-present - executive producer

References

External links

American television directors
American television producers
Living people
Place of birth missing (living people)
Year of birth missing (living people)
Directors Guild of America Award winners